Katzen the Tiger Lady is a female performance artist and tattoo artist, whose full body tattoo theme is that of a tiger. (Katzen is the German word for cats.)

Childhood 
When Katzen was 5 years old, she kept having dreams of herself covered in tiger stripes. When she was nine and living in Japan, she asked her mother to be tattooed and her mother said "Wait until you're 18."

Tattooing 
She received extensive tattooing on all parts of her body and wore tiger whiskers attached via piercings on her face. Most of the feline tattooing occurred between the ages of 18 and 28. More than 227 different tattoo artists have inked her up, including 23 at one time. Katzen removed her plastic whiskers after 14 years of wear because she started to feel that they affected her field of vision.

She was at one time married to Paul Lawrence, who performed under the name "The Enigma," with whom she collaborated in a musical show team called The Human Marvels, and with whom she bore one daughter, Caitlin, who was raised by Katzen's mother. After divorcing, Katzen eventually moved on to have a son, Kevin, and married someone of the same gender.

See also
Stalking Cat
The Lizardman (performer)
Tom Leppard

References

External links
Human Marvels picture website
Interviews with The Enigma and Katzen on tattoo website
Katzen's BME IAM page (registration required)
Katzen's profile at tribe.net

Body modification
Living people
American tattoo artists
Year of birth missing (living people)
People known for being heavily tattooed